Shubhamangala is a 1975 Indian Kannada language film directed by Puttanna Kanagal, based on a novel of the same name by Vani, starring Aarathi and Srinath. The supporting cast features Shivaram, Ambareesh, Musuri Krishnamurthy and K. S. Ashwath.

Plot
Hema is a pampered girl brought up in a small town by her father. Timma and Mooga are her servants, but she treats them just like her friends. Hema is playful and acts like a kid in all matters even though she has reached marriageable age. She meets Prabhakara, her cousin, who is visiting their town after many years. Hema's father, who hates Prabhakara due to a longstanding family-feud sows the seeds of hatred in her mind as well. In a twist of fate, when Hema's father loses all his wealth and passes away, Hema and her two servants are left with no choice but to move in with Prabhakara. The self-respecting Hema takes up a job and strives to become self-reliant. When another twist of fate restores her wealth to her, she is forced to choose between the hate was taught and the love he has showered. The movie is an excellent study of the growth of Hema's character from a spoilt rich girl to an independent and mellow woman capable of taking a mature decision.

Cast
 Aarathi as Hema
 Srinath as Prabhakara / Prabhakara's father
 Ambareesh as Mooga
 Shivaram as Thimma
 Upasane Seetharam as Srinivasayya
 Loknath as Anand Rao, Prabhakara's uncle
 B. V. Radha as Radha, Rao's daughter
 K. S. Ashwath as a doctor
 B. Jaya as Jaya

Soundtrack 
The music of the film was composed by Vijaya Bhaskar with lyrics penned by Kanagal Prabhakara Shasthry, Vijaya Narasimha, Chi. Udaya Shankar and M. N. Vyasa Rao.

Track List

References

External links 
 

1975 films
1970s Kannada-language films
Films directed by Puttanna Kanagal
Films scored by Vijaya Bhaskar